The Aitape River is a river in the Aitape area of northern Papua New Guinea.

See also
List of rivers of Papua New Guinea

References

Rivers of Papua New Guinea